Chervonopartyzansk is a city in Sverdlovsk Municipality, Luhansk Oblast (region) of Ukraine. Population: , .

The city is located at the southeast of Luhansk Oblast in the middle of the main Donets drainage divide that separates watershed of Velyka Kamianka to the north from watersheds of Kundryucha and Burhusta rivers to the south. To the north the city is passed around by a railway line Debaltseve–Zverevo (Russia) with a train station Krasna Mohyla located within the city limits.

An international border between Russia-Ukraine runs along the eastern outskirts of the city. Here is located road border checkpoint as well as railway border checkpoint at the Krasna Mohyla train station.

History
The city was established in November 1960 in the middle of Provallya steppe which is named so for its deep valley with steep slopes. The valley slopes are covered with oak, maple, wild pear, and over a noisy river with willow on its banks.

Its establishment amid Provallya steppe, Chervonopartyzansk is owed primarily to Soviet geologists who in 1930s discovered here large deposits of anthracite. The first mine #63 was built during the World War II (1944) and in 1947 there was founded a large coal-mining company, Chervonyi Partyzan Mine. Its projected capacity was 2.5 thousands tonnes of fossil fuel per day. In 1949-1955 next to Chervonyi Partyzan, there were built less powerful mines Provallya #1 and Provallya #2. In 1956 all of the mines yielded 2.3 thousands of tonnes of anthracite or 16.3% of total extraction by mines of the Sverdlovskvuhillya corporation.

In September 1956 several populated places, among which were Voznesenivka, Novomykolaivka, Krasna Mohyla train station, and a residential neighborhood of the Chervonyi Partyzan Mine, united into a worker's urban-type settlement Chervonopartyzansk which was accounted already for 15,000 of male population. At the end of 1956 more mines were built.

The call of the Communist Party and the Komsomol "Youth – on the construction of mines of Donbas!" raised thousands of young patriots. To the Provallya steppe with "Komsomol travel vouchers" arrived over 2,000 lads and lasses from Odessa and Chernivtsi regions and Moldavia to build over a span of year five mines on the northern slope of the Burhustyn gulch.

Preparation to meet young volunteers organized the Sverdlovsk District Committee of the Communist Party of Ukraine.

Since 2014, Chervonopartyzansk has been controlled by the forces of the Luhansk People's Republic. In July 2014, the city was the scene of fighting during the 2014 pro-Russian conflict in Ukraine.

In 2016 the city was renamed Voznesenivka as part of decommunization in Ukraine. The city's name change process is temporarily suspended as it not fully controlled by the government of Ukraine.

References

External links
 Bondar, O. Chervonopartyzansk. The history of cities and villages of the Ukrainian SSR.

Cities in Luhansk Oblast
Russia–Ukraine border crossings
Populated places established in the Ukrainian Soviet Socialist Republic
Cities of district significance in Ukraine
Sverdlovsk, Luhansk Oblast
Soviet toponymy in Ukraine
City name changes in Ukraine
Mining cities and regions in Ukraine